TER Centre-Val de Loire (operated under the brand Rémi since 2019 and TER Centre prior to 2015) is the regional rail network serving Centre-Val de Loire région of France.

Network
The rail and bus network as of April 2022:

Rail

Bus

Rolling stock

Multiple units
 SNCF Class Z 5300
 SNCF Class Z 7300
 SNCF Class Z 9600
 SNCF Class Z 21500
 SNCF Class Z 26500 (ZGC Z 26500)
 SNCF Class X 4300
 SNCF Class X 72500
 SNCF Class X 73500
 SNCF Class B 81500 (BGC B 81500)

Locomotives
 SNCF Class BB 9200
 SNCF Class BB 22200
 SNCF Class BB 26000
 SNCF Class BB 67300
 SNCF Class BB 67400
 SNCF Class BB 8500
 SNCF Class BB 25500 (Transilien trains, but serving the TER Centre)

See also
SNCF
Transport express régional
Réseau Ferré de France
List of SNCF stations in Centre-Val de Loire
Centre-Val de Loire

References

External links
 Official TER Centre-Val de Loire site

 
Rail transport in Centre-Val de Loire